Trinity Christian Academy is a private Christian school in Jackson, Tennessee, consisting of grades Pre-K through 12. TCA has approximately 800+ students.

Trinity Christian Academy started in 1986 with approximately fifty students in grades K through 7.

Notes

Christian schools in Tennessee
Private K-12 schools in Tennessee
Schools in Madison County, Tennessee
Jackson, Tennessee
Educational institutions established in 1986
1986 establishments in Tennessee